The Price is Right is an Australian television game show that was based on the original 1956–1965 US format.

Format
Two regional versions based on the original 1950s US format aired nearly concurrently – one aired on ATN-7 in Sydney, hosted by Bruce Beeby and later Keith Walshe from 1957 to 1959; the other was on GTV-9 in Melbourne and hosted by Geoff Manion in 1958. The latter version debuted 10 August 1958, airing for 16 episodes on Sundays at 5:30PM. After it ended, the timeslot was taken up by panel discussion series Face the Nation (based on the US series of the same name), which had previously aired at 5:00PM.

In 1963, the Seven Network aired a nationwide version hosted by Horrie Dargie.

See also
 List of Australian television series

References

External links

Seven Network original programming
Nine Network original programming
Black-and-white Australian television shows
1957 Australian television series debuts
1959 Australian television series endings
1963 Australian television series debuts
1963 Australian television series endings
1950s Australian game shows
1960s Australian game shows
The Price Is Right
Television series by Reg Grundy Productions
English-language television shows
Television series by Fremantle (company)
Australian television series based on American television series